Angeliki-Efrosini Kiaou, known as Frosso Kiaou, is a Greek politician who was the Minister of Culture, Education and Religious Affairs in the Caretaker Cabinet of Vassiliki Thanou-Christophilou. She previously served as the Minister for Education, Lifelong Learning and Religious Affairs from May to June 2012 in the Caretaker Cabinet of Panagiotis Pikrammenos.

Education

Kiaou studied law at the University of Hamburg.

Professional career

Kiaou worked as a lawyer, and served at one time as vice president of the Athens Bar Association.

Political career

In 2012, Kiaou wrote to Günter Grass to thank him for a recent poem in which he criticized the European Union's handling of the Greek government-debt crisis.

Personal life

Kiaou is married to Nikos Kiaos, a journalist and former President of the ESIEA, the journalists' union of Athens newspapers.

References

External links

Politicians from Athens
Living people
Government ministers of Greece
Culture ministers of Greece
University of Hamburg alumni
Year of birth missing (living people)